Versto is a surname. Notable people with the surname include:

Aslak Versto (1924–1992), Norwegian politician
Astrid Versto (born 1953), Norwegian journalist and diplomat
Olav Versto (1950–2011), Norwegian journalist and editor
Olav Aslakson Versto (1892–1977), Norwegian politician
Stein Versto (born 1957), Norwegian poet, novelist, translator and folk musician